J Michael Howard-Johnston is a male former rower who competed for England.

Rowing career
He represented England and won a bronze medal in the coxed four and a second bronze medal in the eights, at the 1962 British Empire and Commonwealth Games in Perth, Western Australia.

References

English male rowers
Commonwealth Games medallists in rowing
Commonwealth Games bronze medallists for England
Rowers at the 1962 British Empire and Commonwealth Games
Medallists at the 1962 British Empire and Commonwealth Games